The Arenas River is a river of Yabucoa, Puerto Rico.

See also

 List of rivers in Puerto Rico

References

External links
 USGS Hydrologic Unit Map – Caribbean Region (1974)
 Rios de Puerto Rico

Rivers of Puerto Rico